Pharcidodes is a genus of beetles in the family Cerambycidae, containing the following species:

 Pharcidodes divisus Martins, 1976
 Pharcidodes nigripennis Martins, 1985
 Pharcidodes rubiginosus (Thomson, 1878)
 Pharcidodes suturalis (Gounelle, 1909)

References

Piezocerini